John Ernest Douglas Delavalette Browne (born 17 October 1938) is a British former politician, soldier, investment banker and writer now based in West Palm Beach, Florida, United States of America.

Early life
Browne was born in Hampshire, raised on a family farm near Bath, and educated at Malvern College, Royal Military Academy Sandhurst, Cranfield Institute of Technology and Harvard Business School. He served as an officer in the Grenadier Guards from 1959 to 1967 and as the first Guards territorial, in the Grenadier Guards (V), retiring as a Major. He served abroad in Germany, Cyprus, and British Guiana as Signals Officer and as the Battalion Pilot in British Guiana. Upon graduation from Harvard, he joined Morgan Stanley & Co. on Wall Street. On returning to England, he became Director of Middle East Operations of European Banking Company, a director of Worms Investments, Tijari Finance (a Kuwaiti bank), The Churchill Clinic, Scansat TV. He was a Court Member of Southampton University and an Advisor to Control Risks and to Barclays Bank. He served as a Councillor for Knightsbridge ward on Westminster City Council from 1974 to 1978.

Parliamentary career
Browne was Conservative Party Member of Parliament for Winchester from 1979 to 1992. In Parliament, he introduced The Privacy Bill (which, with Lords' Amendments, was talked out under Government Whips' direction at its third reading), The Armed Forces Liability for Injury Bill and one Act of Parliament to further the protection of animals. He was elected Chairman of the Conservative Backbench Small Business Committee (1984–87) and Secretary of the Conservative Backbench Finance (1981–83) and Defence (1982–83) Committees; appointed a Member of the Treasury Select Committee (1982–87) and a Delegate to the North Atlantic Assembly—the political arm of NATO--(1986–92) where he was Rapporteur on Human Rights (1989–92).

At the 1992 general election, he stood as an Independent Conservative candidate in Winchester after he refused to submit his name for what he termed "a disgraceful socialist style fixed double jeopardy" re-selection by the Conservative Party Central Office. He had been suspended briefly from the House of Commons for not declaring two of the clients of his finance company, which had been declared always. He had been instructed previously not to declare the clients of his company by the Registrar of Members' Interests. The Registrar told him that it was "unnecessary as farmers and lawyers do not have to declare any clients whatsoever. In particular, if you were the director of a large company, like ICI, with many thousands of clients, their voluminous declarations would make a mockery of the registry". He lost his seat.

Post Parliament
Subsequently, Browne stood as a "Conservative against European Union" in the European Election of 1992 achieving the highest vote of any minor party or independent candidate in the nation. The following year, Browne stood unsuccessfully at the 1993 Newbury by-election. Later, he joined the UK Independence Party, becoming a vice-president. He stood unsuccessfully for UKIP as a parliamentary candidate in Falmouth and Camborne in 2001 and in North Devon in 2005, where he was one of only a few UKIP candidates to save their deposits.

He divorced his first wife, French-born Elizabeth Garthwaite in 1985. He is currently divorced from his second wife, American-born Elaine Boylen.

He worked for Euro Pacific Capital, NY (founded by Peter Schiff) as its Senior Market Strategist.

Currently, he is a writer for Newsmax Media and is interviewed regularly on financial and political TV programs in America. Browne is also a real estate agent with Illustrated Properties in Palm Beach, Florida.

He is a Liveryman of the Goldsmiths Company, an Officer of the Order of Saint John (where he served on Chapter General from 1987 to 1990) and a Governor of Malvern College.

He is the author of two books, Grenadier Grins (short, fun reminiscences of a life associated with the Grenadier Guards, 1956 to 2006) in 2006 and Hidden Account of the Romanovs (2013).

In popular culture
Browne was portrayed by Charles McCurdy in the 2002 BBC production of Ian Curteis' controversial The Falklands Play.

References

The Times Guide to the House of Commons, Times Newspapers Ltd, 1992

External links
 

 Euro Pacific Capital Inc : Broker's Corner.

Living people
1938 births
Conservative Party (UK) MPs for English constituencies
Independent politicians in England
People educated at Malvern College
UK Independence Party parliamentary candidates
UK MPs 1979–1983
UK MPs 1983–1987
UK MPs 1987–1992
Graduates of the Royal Military Academy Sandhurst
British emigrants to the United States
Harvard Business School alumni
Conservative Party (UK) councillors
Councillors in the City of Westminster